Stirlingia divaricatissima is a shrub endemic to Western Australia.

It blooms in October producing yellow flowers.

It is found on wet depressions in the Great Southern  region of Western Australia where it grows in sandy-clay soils.

References

Eudicots of Western Australia
divaricatissima
Endemic flora of Western Australia
Plants described in 1995